The 5th Parliament of Upper Canada was opened 2 February 1809.  Elections in Upper Canada had been held in May 1808.  All sessions were held at York, Upper Canada and sat at the Parliament Buildings of Upper Canada.  This parliament was dissolved 1 May 1812 by the Administrator of the Government Isaac Brock who had been frustrated in his efforts to pass legislation preparing the colony for war with the United States.

This House of Assembly of the 5th Parliament of Upper Canada had four sessions 2 February 1809 to 6 March 1812:

See also
Legislative Council of Upper Canada
Executive Council of Upper Canada
Legislative Assembly of Upper Canada
Lieutenant Governors of Upper Canada, 1791-1841
Historical federal electoral districts of Canada
List of Ontario provincial electoral districts

References

Further reading 
Handbook of Upper Canadian Chronology, Frederick H. Armstrong, Toronto : Dundurn Press, 1985. 

05
1809 establishments in Upper Canada
1812 disestablishments in Upper Canada